Anna-Louise Milne is a specialist of twentieth century Parisian history and culture. In particular she has been a leading commentator on the writer Jean Paulhan and the Nouvelle Revue Française, an important literary review of the 1930s and 1940s. She has published widely on French history and culture. She currently lectures at the University of London Institute in Paris (ULIP).

Publications

Books
 The Extreme In-Between: Jean Paulhan's Place in the Twentieth Century (Oxford: Legenda, 2006), 164 pp.
 75 (Paris: Gallimard, 2016), 208 pp.

Edited text
 Correspondence Jean Paulhan–Yvon Belaval (Paris: Gallimard, coll. Cahiers de la NRF, 2004), pp 309.

Translation
 Translation of Mieke Bal, The Mottled Screen: Reading Proust Visually (Stanford: Stanford University Press, 1997).

Edited collections
 Guest editing of special issue of The Romanic Review (99:1-2) entitled 'La Nouvelle Revue Française' in the Age of Modernism (2006)

Articles
 "Préface à une traduction à venir", Dossier Bernard Lamarche-Vadel, L'Infini, 70 (Summer 2000), pp 65–69.
 "Placing the Commonplace: Translation According to Jean Paulhan", Palimpsestes, 13 (Summer 2001), pp 129–140.
 Review article of Malcolm Bowie, Proust Among the Stars, Cambridge Quarterly, 30, no 3 (Spring 2001), pp 275–278.
 "Faux et usage de faux: Paulhan joue Stendhal contre Valéry", Bulletin des Etudes Valériennes, 14 (January 2003), pp 101–116.
 "Food for Thought: ethnographie et rhétorique selon Jean Paulhan", Littérature, 129 (March 2003), pp 107–123.
 "Getting Impersonal", review article of Christophe Charle, La Crise des sociétés impériales : Allemagne, France, Grande-Bretagne 1900–1940, Franco-British Studies, 32 (Spring 2003), pp 72–77.
 "Sensing the Obscure, Obscuring the Sense: Estrangement in the Translation and Re-Translation of Proust's A la recherche du temps perdu", Palimpsestes, 15 (October 2004), pp 109–119.
 "The Power of Dissimulation: ‘When you are only three white men...’", Yale French Studies, 106 (March 2005), pp 109–124.
 "Hallucinatory Figures: Some Examples from Michel Tournier's Vendredi ou les limbes du Pacifique and its Translation Friday by Norman Denny", Palimpsestes, 17 (September 2005), pp 95–111.
 "Seeing Under the Skin", review of Sara Danius, The Senses of Modernism: Technology, Perception, and Aesthetics, The Senses and Society, 1, no 2 (July 2006), pp 273–275.

Sources 
 https://web.archive.org/web/20080929062849/http://www.ulip.lon.ac.uk/staff/staff/staff-profiles/anna-louise-milne.html 
 https://web.archive.org/web/20080424100806/http://www.rhul.ac.uk/Modern-Languages/Research/Conferences/May-68-Conference.html 
 https://web.archive.org/web/20070610024817/http://www.abdn.ac.uk/modernthought/archive/publications/tarbes.php 
 http://www.sllf.qmul.ac.uk/french/centenary_programme.pdf 
 https://web.archive.org/web/20081007000656/http://www.atelierpdf.com/paulhan.sljp/acrobat/bulletins/bulletin28-bilan.pdf
 http://h-net.msu.edu/cgi-bin/logbrowse.pl?trx=vx&list=h-diplo&month=0608&week=c&msg=Itmpe978912Kv3%2BrEqeMiw&user=&pw= 
 https://web.archive.org/web/20081205070538/http://www.swan.ac.uk/french/Research/Conferences/2007RomanceStudiesColloquium/Programme/
 http://www.gallimard.fr/Catalogue/GALLIMARD/Blanche/75

External links 
 www.annalouisemilne.net  Anna-Louise Milne's personal website

Academics of the University of London Institute in Paris
Living people
Year of birth missing (living people)